Chinameca Municipality is a municipality in Veracruz, Mexico.

Geography
It is located in the south-east zone of the State of Veracruz, about 290 km from state capital Xalapa. It has a surface of 157.10 km2.

Chinameca Municipality is delimited to the north by Mecayapan Municipality and Pajapan Municipality, to the east by Cosoleacaque Municipality, to the south by Oteapan Municipality, Jaltipan de Morelos Municipality and Soconusco Municipality and to the west by Soteapan Municipality.

Products
It produces principally maize, beans and oranges.

Events
In  Chinameca , in December takes place the celebration in honor to Purísima Concepción, Patron of the town.

Weather
The weather in  Chinameca  is warm all year with rains in summer and autumn.

References

External links 
  Municipal Official webpage
  Municipal Official Information

Municipalities of Veracruz